Mhlangeni, also known as Hertzog, is a settlement in Amathole District Municipality in the Eastern Cape province of South Africa.

Village in the Kat River Valley, 7 km south-west of Seymour and some 27 km north-east of Fort Beaufort. Originally named Tamboekievlei, then in 1837, named after Willem Frederik Hertzog (1792–1847), Assistant Surveyor-General of the Cape Colony from 1828 and surveyor of the Kat River Settlement. It is now known as Mhlangeni.

References

Populated places in the Raymond Mhlaba Local Municipality